1,1'-Ferrocenetrisulfide is the organoiron compound with the formula . A yellow solid, it is the simplest polysulfide derivative of ferrocene. It can be synthesized by treatment of dilithioferrocene with elemental sulfur.  Using proton NMR spectroscopy, the relatively slow conformational flexing of the trisulfide ring can be established.

References 

Ferrocenes
Cyclopentadienyl complexes
Polysulfides